Chaostheorie (English: Chaos Theory) is the second album by German band Revolverheld. It was released by Sony BMG on 25 May 2007 in German-speaking Europe. Another commercial success, the album debuted at the number three on the German Albums Chart, and remained within the top 10 for several weeks. Chaostheorie spawned three singles, including "Ich werd' die Welt verändern", "Du explodierst" and "Unzertrennlich".

Track listing

Charts

References

2007 albums
German-language albums
Revolverheld albums